The Mutasarrifate of Karak, also known as the Sanjak of Karak, was an Ottoman district with special administrative status established in 1895, located in modern-day Jordan. The city of Karak was the district's capital. It had a population of 72,562 in 1914.

History
In May 1892, a proposal was made for a regional government centered in Ma'an (previously known as Sanjak of Ma'an founded in 1579 as part of Eyalet of Damascus) which was approved in August. In mid-1895, the centre of this mutasarrifiyya was moved to Karak, marking the southernmost extent of Ottoman rule in the vilayet of Syria.

Subdistricts 
The Mutasarrifate of Karak was made up of four districts (kazas):
 Kaza of Karak (Kerek)
 Kaza of Al-Salt
 Kaza of Ma'an
 Kaza of Tafilah (Tafîle)

References

States and territories established in the 19th century
Sanjaks of Ottoman Syria
19th-century establishments in the Ottoman Empire
1918 disestablishments in the Ottoman Empire